Progress 31 was a Soviet uncrewed Progress cargo spacecraft, which was launched in August 1987 to resupply the Mir space station.

Launch
Progress 31 launched on 3 August 1987 from the Baikonur Cosmodrome in the Kazakh SSR. It used a Soyuz-U2 rocket.

Docking
Progress 31 docked with the aft port of the Kvant-1 module of Mir on 5 August 1987 at 22:27:35 UTC, and was undocked on 21 September 1987 at 23:57:41 UTC.

Decay
It remained in orbit until 23 September 1987, when it was deorbited. The deorbit burn occurred at 00:22:00 UTC and the mission ended at 01:02 UTC.

See also

 1987 in spaceflight
 List of Progress missions
 List of uncrewed spaceflights to Mir

References

Progress (spacecraft) missions
1987 in the Soviet Union
Spacecraft launched in 1987
Spacecraft which reentered in 1987
Spacecraft launched by Soyuz-U rockets